= Lala Mohammadpur =

Lala Mohammadpur is a small town located in Kanker Khera, Meerut Cantonment, Uttar Pradesh, India. This place has 2 UP board schools, Kaushik Girls Inter College and Kaushik Inter College.
